Evato is a rural municipality in Madagascar. It belongs to the district of Farafangana, which is a part of Atsimo-Atsinanana Region. The population of the commune was estimated to be approximately 13,000 in 2001 commune census.

Primary and junior level secondary education are available in town. The majority 95% of the population of the commune are farmers.  The most important crops are rice and bananas; also coffee is an important agricultural product. Services provide employment for 4% of the population. Additionally fishing employs 1% of the population.

References

Populated places in Atsimo-Atsinanana